Jochen Janssen (born 22 January 1976) is a retired Belgian football striker.

References

1976 births
Living people
Belgian footballers
K.F.C. Lommel S.K. players
K.V.C. Westerlo players
Club Brugge KV players
FK Austria Wien players
RKC Waalwijk players
Sint-Truidense V.V. players
FC Den Bosch players
Lommel S.K. players
Association football forwards
Belgian Pro League players
Eredivisie players
Austrian Football Bundesliga players
Belgian expatriate footballers
Expatriate footballers in Austria
Belgian expatriate sportspeople in Austria
Expatriate footballers in the Netherlands
Belgian expatriate sportspeople in the Netherlands